Revolution is the third studio album from Christian rock band All Star United. It was released in 2002 after the band signed up with Furious Records. The album features an almost entirely new band, with Ian Eskelin still heading them.  The number 27018036090 is featured on the cover and throughout the album's packaging.  No explanation is given for the reason for this number.  One possibility is that it is geographic coordinates.  The coordinates 27.0180 36.090 maps to a spot along Highway 5 in Saudi Arabia east of the Red Sea and 100 miles south east of the Sinai Peninsula but the significance of this location as it relates to the band or the album is unknown.

Track listing
 "We Are the Future" (3:28)
 "Let It Rain" (I'm Gonna Shine) (3:20)
 "Revolution" (3:03)
 "Sweet Jesus" (3:54)
 "Making It Beautiful" (2:04)
 "Kings and Queens" (3:22)
 "Made In Heaven" (2:49)
 "You Can Count On Me" (3:11)
 "Global Breakdown" (2:53)
 "Weirdo" (2:39)

Personnel
 Ian Eskelin - Vocals, Keyboards
 Richard Evenlind - Guitar, Bass Guitar
 Matt Payne - Drums, Guitar
 Steve Hindalong - Percussion
 Jeremy Hunter - Bass
 Chris Dauphin - Piano
 Tommy Rodgers - Violin & Viola
 Adrian Walther - Bass
 Brain Whitman - Backing Vocals
 Frank Lenz - Drums

References

2002 albums
All Star United albums